Marko Čampar (born 16 August 1987) is a Serbian football goalkeeper, playing for Radnik Ušće.

Club career
Born in Kraljevo, Čampar was with youth categories of FK Rad, and later joined Sinđelić Beograd, where he spent a period between 2005 and 2006. He was also with Sloga Kraljevo, Omladinac Novo Selo and Sloboda Užice until he joined Radnički Sombor for the 2009–10 season.
Playing with that club, Čampar made 8 Serbian First League appearances. He was on the field in matches against Teleoptik, Mladost Lučani, Srem, Srem, Zemun, Novi Pazar, Proleter Novi Sad, Bežanija, and Sloboda Užice. After a half-season he spent with Prva Petoletka, Čampar moved to Romania, where he played with several clubs including Oțelul Galați, Petrolul Ploiești, Prahova Tomsani and Brazi. He was also with Hungarian side Kaposvári Rákóczi in 2013. After that, he returned in Serbia and joined Ozren Sokobanja, where he was until the end of 2014. During the 2015, he was with Sloga Despotovac. At the beginning of 2016, Čampar returned in his home town and joined Sloga Kraljevo for the second time in his senior career, but spent mostly time as a reserve option and left the club in summer same year. Although he was related with Morava Zone League side Karađorđe Ribnica, Čampar joined Real Podunavci for the 2016–17 season. In summer 2017, Čampar moved to Radnik Ušće.

References

External links
 
 
 

1987 births
Living people
Sportspeople from Kraljevo
Serbian footballers
Association football goalkeepers
FK Sinđelić Beograd players
FK Sloga Kraljevo players
FK Sloboda Užice players
FK Radnički Sombor players
Serbian First League players
Serbian expatriate footballers
Serbian expatriate sportspeople in Romania
Expatriate footballers in Romania
ASC Oțelul Galați players
FC Petrolul Ploiești players
Serbian expatriate sportspeople in Hungary
Expatriate footballers in Hungary
Kaposvári Rákóczi FC players